The Twelve Apostles Marine National Park is a protected marine national park located on the south-west coast of Victoria, Australia. The  marine park is situated near Port Campbell and is named after the scenic Twelve Apostles rock stacks, and contains the wreck of the clipper Loch Ard, wrecked on Mutton Bird Island in 1878.  The marine park borders Port Campbell and Great Otway National Parks.

See also

 Protected areas of Victoria

References

External links

Marine parks in Victoria (Australia)
Coastline of Victoria (Australia)
Great Ocean Road
Protected areas established in 2002
2002 establishments in Australia
Parks of Barwon South West (region)